The Lyzohub Government was the first official government of Ukrainian State that was confirmed on 4 May 1918 after Pavlo Skoropadsky managed to oust the previous socialist government led by Vsevolod Holubovych and dissolve the Central Council of Ukraine. Most of its candidates were already pre-selected by Mykola Vasylenko who took the portfolio of Minister of National Education. 

On October 5, 1918 the opposition represented by the Ukrainian National Union and led by Volodymyr Vynnychenko demanded almost half of government portfolios, but managed to convince the Hetman of Ukraine Pavlo Skoropadsky to include five of its own ministers. On October 24 that petition was approved. The same day several dismissed ministers wrote the "Statement of niners" where they urged the government to sign federalization agreement with Russia.

Original composition

Changes
During summer
 Yuriy Sokolovsky was replaced with Sergei Gerbel as the Minister of Food
 Mykhailo Chubynsky was replaced with A.Romanov as the Minister of Justice
 Fedir Lyzohub was relieved from being acting as the Minister of Internal Affairs which was passed to Ihor Kistiakovsky
 S.Zavadsky became the State secretary

October 24, UNU coalition
 Ihor Kistiakovsky was replaced with acting Viktor Reinbot
 Vasiliy Zienkowski was replaced with Oleksandr Lototsky
 Mykola Vasylenko was replaced with Petro Stebnytsky
 Vasiliy Kolokoltsov was replaced with Volodymyr Leontovych
 A.Romanov was replaced with Andriy Vyazlov
 Yuliy Wagner was replaced with Maksym Slavinsky
 Sergei Hutnik was replaced with Sergei Mering
 Yuriy Afanasiev was replaced with S.Petrov

Coalition / opposition
 Pro-Russian: Vasylenko, Rzepecki, Grebel, Hutnik, Romanov, Zienkowski, Kokoltsev, Wagner, Afanasiev, Zavadsky
Union with the Triple Entente, plebiscite for the union with Russia
 Pro-Ukrainian: Kistiakovsky, Lyubynsky, Doroshenko, Butenko, Rohoza
 Denouncing of the Brest-Litovsk treaty, complete independence

References

External links
 Hetman government at the Encyclopedia of Ukraine

Ukrainian governments
1918 establishments in Ukraine
1918 disestablishments in Ukraine
Cabinets established in 1918
Cabinets disestablished in 1918
Ukrainian People's Republic